Stongdey Monastery, often written Stongde, Stongday, Tonday or Thonde, is a flourishing Buddhist monastery in Zanskar, Ladakh, northern India, approximately 18 km north of Padum, on the road to Zangla.

The gompa was founded in 1052 by Naropa's disciple, the famous translator Lama Marpa Lotsawa (1012-1097). It was taken over by the Gelugpa about four centuries later and became dedicated to Je Tsongkhapa.

It is the second largest monastic institution in Zanskar, with a community of about 60 Gelukpa monks. Every year the Gustor Festival is held on the 28th and 29th day in the eleventh month of the Tibetan calendar.

There are seven temples in all. The Tshogs-khang is decorated with exquisite painting including some with deities on a black background outlined in gold.

Footnotes

References
 Janet Rizvi. (1996). Ladakh: Crossroads of High Asia. Second Edition. Oxford University Press, Delhi. .
 Schettler, Margaret & Rolf (1981). Kashmir, Ladakh & Zanskar. Lonely Planet Publications. South Yarra, Victoria, Australia. .

External links

Buddhist monasteries in Ladakh
Gelug monasteries and temples
Buddhism in Lahaul and Spiti district
Buildings and structures in Lahaul and Spiti district
1052 establishments in Asia
11th-century establishments in India